Alexei Badyukov (born April 20, 1978) is a Russian professional ice hockey centre who currently plays for HC CSKA Moscow of the Kontinental Hockey League (KHL).

References

External links
 

1978 births
Living people
Ak Bars Kazan players
Avangard Omsk players
Amur Khabarovsk players
HC CSKA Moscow players
HC Dynamo Moscow players
Severstal Cherepovets players
Krylya Sovetov Moscow players
Lokomotiv Yaroslavl players
Russian ice hockey centres
Ice hockey people from Moscow